Zafeiris Volikakis (born June 20, 1989, in Volos) is a Greek track cyclist who represented Greece at the 2012 Summer Olympics, along with his brother Christos Volikakis.

Career highlights

Greek Championship

2005    1st in National Championship, Track, Sprint, Novices, Greece (GRE)
2005    1st in National Championship, Track, 500 m, Novices, Greece (GRE)
2006    1st in National Championship, Track, Team Sprint, Juniors, Greece (GRE)  + Christos Volikakis, Nikolaos Dimotakis,
2006    1st in National Championship, Track, Sprint, Juniors, Greece (GRE)
2007    1st in National Championship, Track, Team Sprint, Juniors, Greece (GRE)  + Sotirios Bretas, Dimitris Voukelatos,
2007    1st in National Championship, Track, Team Sprint, Elite, Greece (GRE)  + Christos Volikakis, Vasileios Galanis,
2007    1st in National Championship, Track, 1 km, Juniors, Greece (GRE)
2007    1st in National Championship, Track, Keirin, Juniors, Greece (GRE)
2007    1st in National Championship, Track, Sprint, Juniors, Greece (GRE)
2009    2nd in National Championship, Track, Keirin, Elite, Greece, Athens (GRE)
2011    3rd in National Championship, Track, Keirin, Elite, Greece (GRE)
2011    1st in National Championship, Track, Team Sprint, Elite, Greece (GRE)  + Georgios Bouglas, Christos Volikakis,

Balkan Open

2007    3rd in Athens Open Balkan Championship, Track, Team Sprint, Elite/U23, Greece, Athens (GRE)
2007    1st in Athens Open Balkan Championship, Track, Keirin, Juniors, Greece, Athens (GRE)
2007    1st in Athens Open Balkan Championship, Track, Sprint, Juniors, Greece, Athens (GRE)

European Championship

2006    2nd in European Championship, Track, Team Sprint, Juniors, Athens

World Grand Prix

2011    3rd in Moscou, Keirin (RUS)

World Championships

2006    3rd in World Championship, Track, Team Sprint, Juniors, Gent
2010    13th in World Championship, Track, Team Sprint, Elite, København
2010    17th in World Championship, Track, Keirin, Elite, København

References

External links 
 
 The HERAKLION KASTRO – MURCIA TEAM website

1989 births
Sportspeople from Volos
Living people
Greek male cyclists
Greek track cyclists
Olympic cyclists of Greece
Cyclists at the 2012 Summer Olympics
Cyclists at the 2019 European Games
European Games competitors for Greece
21st-century Greek people